Henry Adamson (1581–1637) was a Scottish poet and historian.

Adamson was the son of James Adamson, Dean of the Merchant Guildry and Provost of Perth, Scotland, baptised on 11 November 1581. Henry set out to train as a priest, after his uncle Patrick Adamson, but instead became a schoolmaster in his home city. He died before July in the year 1637.

His friend William Drummond encouraged the publication of his most famous poem: Muses Threnodie: of Mirthful Mournings on the death of Mr Gall, (Edinburgh 1638 – see 1638 in poetry). The poem is an important document for its general account of Perth in the seventeenth century. Adamson is credited with first using the word curling in 1620. He related that his friend, Mr Gall, "a citizen of Perth, and a gentle-man of goodly stature, and pregnant wit, much given to pastime, as golf, archerie, curling and jovial companie". It also records the playing of Golf on the South Inch:

It is also particularly noted for its observation of rosicrucianism, freemasonry and second sight. Referring to the rebuilding of a bridge over the River Tay, swept away in 1621, Adamson wrote:

References

Further reading

External links
Extracts from The Muses Threnodie (but not listing the extract dealing with the Mason word)
AdamsonAncestry.com

1581 births
1639 deaths
Writers from Perth, Scotland
Alumni of the University of St Andrews
17th-century Scottish historians
Scottish poets
Freemasonry in Scotland
Poets from the Kingdom of Scotland